The Grahams are an Alternative Pop group made up of lifelong musical and romantic partners, Alyssa and Doug Graham. Playing together on a variety of stages, the duo joined together to release their debut album, Riverman's Daughter, in the fall of 2013. They traveled The Great River Road, writing new songs for the album, which was later produced by Grammy-winner Malcolm Burn. The Grahams announced their third studio album 'Kids Like Us', which was the final album to be produced with Richard Swift, and it was released 27 March 2020.

History
In late 2012, The Grahams, a creation of artistic expression by Alyssa and Doug Graham, was born, and a historical musical journey began. The couple quickly identified their mission, to create an authentic direction through music, writing, filmmaking, and story telling.

Their first album, Riverman’s Daughter, was the result of a long and winding journey to the heart of America, and during that time sacrifice and loss coupled with their rigorous journey came the inspiration to write. “Throughout their tours and travels, Alyssa and Doug Graham wrote the 12 songs that comprise the work as they made their way along the Great River Road that parallels the Mississippi. They stopped in various juke joints, exchanging stories and playing music with the locals. At the end of their journey, they holed up in a houseboat in rural Louisiana where the Mississippi spills into the Atchafalaya swamp, and periodically invited friends and musicians onboard to help them hone the material.” Including lifelong friend and writing partner, Bryan McCann

Riverman's Daughter was recorded in RCA studios, (then owned by Ben Folds) with Malcom Burn at the helm. The album was complemented with imagery by photographer David Johnson Riverman's Daughter was released digitally worldwide, on CD, and on Vinyl in the US and Canada on September 3, 2013.

The marketing campaign, coordinated by CEN, included PR, radio promotion, video promotion, touring, sales initiatives, licensing outreach and more.

At radio the album debuted on the Americana radio charts four different times from late 2013 to early 2014, a feat that promotion man Al Moss had never seen in his long career. It would eventually spend a total of 12 weeks in the Top 40. A number of on-air radio broadcasts were also arranged.

In 2015 the AMA charts combined Internet radio with the terrestrial stations. During the Riverman's Daughter release this was not the case. On the Terrestrial side there were 2561 spins during the charting period and approximately 500+ spins on the internet side.

The album was supported by music videos for the songs “Revival Time,” “A Good Man,” “Down by The River,” “Cathedral Pines,” and “Marni Hawkins.”

In the summer and fall of 2014, and around their Australia tour, The Grahams conceived of their next creative enterprise, which again incorporated a journey through a historical American musical landscape. In preparation for their sophomore album the band traveled the country by rail, not only visiting iconic musical destinations, but traveling by one, as the railroad had been the conduit for inspiration for many of the forefathers of American roots music.

In addition, the band came up with the idea to document part of their rail journey on film, and to recreate the new songs in a live setting at iconic recording studios along the way. With the new album being recorded with Grammy nominated producer Wes Sharon in Norman, Oklahoma, and a documentary film and live recordings in the works, 2015 would see the release of three major creations by The Grahams; their second album Glory Bound, the musical documentary by North Mississippi Allstars' Cody Dickinson, Rattle the Hocks, and the live in studio album Rattle the Hocks.

Prior to release a tour ensued to test the waters of the new material and show the film in club settings. Beginning the new year with 30A, FAI & SXSW & two shows at the AMA Music Conference.

In 2015 the band played over 75 shows, 15 of which featured the Rattle the Hocks film as the opener. The band played four in-store performances and performed at the RED party at the AEC retail convention. During the year the band shared the stage with Ray Wylie Hubbard, Leon Russell, Parker Milsap, The Wood Brothers, and the Black Lillie’s, John Fullbright, among others.

Rattle the Hocks was submitted for all appropriate film festivals and was screened at five; San Jose, Napa; Crossroads, Chagrin and Raindance (UK). The band performed at Chagrin and Raindance, playing the historic 100 Club.

In August 2019, the band announced plans to release a new album, 'Kids Like Us', in early 2020, written during their motorcycle journey down Route 66. The first single from the album 'Just What You Deserve' was released in June, followed by 'Bite My Tongue' in September. Third single 'Heartbroken Town' was released November 2019 and was accompanied by a music video shot at the famed Abbey Road studios in London, during a break from touring that summer. Fourth single 'Painted Desert' premiered with Billboard in January 2020. The title track to the album ,'Kids Like Us' was worked at US triple A commercial and non-commercial radio stations nationwide following the album's release (March 27, 2020), and the video for the track debuted with BandsInTown, May 2020.

Selected discography 

 2013 – Riverman's Daughter – (3Sirens, CEN)
2015 – Rattle the Hocks – (3Sirens, CEN)
2016 – Glory Bound – (3Sirens, CEN)
2017 – The Grahams and Friends – (3Sirens, CEN)
Source: All Music

References

External links 
 Official Site

American rock music groups